Shilpi Sharma (born 26 March 1983), sometimes credited as Shilpi Mudgal, is an Indian actress, model and DJ.

Early life and education
Sharma originates from a city called Dholpur in the state of Rajasthan, near the city of Agra. She hails from The Jagan Family, one of the most well-known and powerful political and entrepreneurial families in the Indian state of Rajasthan. Her late father, Murari Lal Sharma, served as Nagar Palika, Chairman of Dholpur as Pradhan; her mother and brothers are similarly involved in business and governmental departments. Her uncle Banwari Lal Sharma  is a Congress candidate and served as an MLA & Minister for over two decades. Her Brother Ritesh Sharma was a Mayor of Dholpur.

She studied in Nainital & Mumbai and has a degree in acting and interior designing from New York, United States.

As a DJ
In 2014, as a DJ, Sharma became famous for remixing the song "Baby Doll" from the movie Ragini MMS 2. She touched new heights when her song "Chittiyaan Kalaiyaan" from the movie Roy was released. She has been remixing most of Shah Rukh Khan's film songs. Shilpi Sharma is on a roll with her three super hit remixes for the film Dilwale. Produced all-time chartbuster remixes of Shahrukh Khan’s films Dilwale, Jab Harry Met Sejal, Happy New Year, Dear Zindagi, and Raees. Her official Dilwale Soundtrack Remix Album was launched by Shah Rukh Khan himself. She is the only female DJ in India to have her own show on 9XM channel – 9XM House of Dance (two seasons 2020 & 2021): the biggest party mashup show in the country.

Sharma is voted as the top-ranking DJs in India consecutively for the last two years by DJanemag.

TV advertisement
Sharma started her career by acting in television advertisements. She was the face of Pears Soap for five years. She did ads for other brands such as HSBC, Larsen & Tubro, Icici, Khaitan Fans, Babool Toothpaste, Nippo Gold Batteries with Rahul Dravid, McDonald's, Park Avenue, and Colgate

Film career

After doing a number of ads, she made her movie debut as a lead actress with director N. Chandra's comedy thriller Style. She was next cast as a lead actress opposite Sunny deol in Rahul Rawail's Jo Bole So Nihaal. She made  a brief appearance in Subhash Ghai's film, Right Yaa Wrong.
In 2012, she has acted in Madhur Bhandarkar's film Heroine, this drama film was written, directed, and co-produced by Madhur Bhandarkar. In the film, Shilpi Sharma's character name was Isha Sharma. Shilpi described her chance in Bhandarkar as "a family friend" who was approached by the director to play a glamorous role. Shilpi is also currently signed for many Bollywood films. Shilpi also did a special appearance in the film Thank You.

Awards and recognition
DJ Shilpi Sharma received Young Women Achievers Award.
Felicitated by ex-President Pratibha Patil for her work towards social causes.

Filmography

Discography

See also
List of Indian film actresses

References

External links

 
 

Indian film actresses
Actresses in Hindi cinema
21st-century Indian actresses
Living people
1977 births
People from Rajasthan